William Tomison was a Scottish fur trader who helped found and build a number of trading posts for the Hudson Bay Company such as the Edmonton House. He was involved in the fur trade for over thirty years, during which time he served in York Factory and the Severn House. During his fifty years of service with the Hudson Bay Company, Tomison worked his way through the ranks.

Early life 
Tomison was born in the Orkney Islands in 1739.

Career 

William Tomison's career with the Hudson Bay Company started in 1760. There was a lack of trading posts in particular areas, when Tomison started there was not one in the Western interior. This was vital information that helped William Tomison progress within the Hudson Bay Company, giving him insight. He progressed within the Hudson Bay Company and moved through the ranks and became the Governor Inland Master and later helped them as a company to expand. Whilst the smallpox epidemic occurred Tomison's journals showcased the sheer work that had and the employees at Cumberland House to be put in to try and help the Aboriginal people. It displayed a compassionate side to Tomison despite many regarding him as a man that was not pleasant, but the journal suggests that he was not entirely cold-hearted. William Tomison was selected to lead the Hudson Bay Company's expansion and this one could suggest he was partly the reason for the Hudson Bay Company compete throughout Saskatchewan River with other Canadian traders. After the outbreak of the smallpox disease in 1730 the pursuit and conquest to gain control of fur production was important. William gained hands on experience in a somewhat unconventional manner. For the duration of two years Tomison was at the Lake Winnipeg and gained invaluable education that helped set him apart from other Hudson Bay Traders. During that period he learned and he understood the Aboriginal customs, language and their general community. In 1767 Tomison became one of Hudson Bay's inland travellers from York Factory He was one of the earliest employees that were sent to network and create vital connection with the First Nations. Tomison's personality hindered him from progressing any further in the company.  Many Indians refused to trade and directly make deals with him which was arguably, one of the reasons that jeopardised Tomison moving higher. He delegated with authority and recorded his thoughts in his journal, although he protected his men and tried to ensure they were safe in the process he stated that "its dangerous to send out men with the Natives at present, as several of them is of a very savage Nature." However due to his observation there were new strategies put in place, the traders made the decision to avoid the Natives from seeing them so they shipped furs during the night. There was great hunger during this time and there were extreme measures put in place

Smallpox epidemic 

At the beginning of the 1780s there was an outbreak of smallpox in the Western Canada, the Northern Great Plains which severely affected the villages and the population reduced drastically in size by about 70-80%. William Tomison is greatly known for the records that he made of this epidemic, he recorded in his diary in great detail concerning this. Giving thorough detail and updates regarding Cree Indians who were struck by smallpox, he also journalled about those that came to him to seek help. His journal contained great detail about this outbreak and it brought clarity about the epidemic. From records and accounts from the time it is clear that the British employees did not suffer from smallpox as they were in contact with it or had smallpox or a similar disease when they were infants. The British employees of HBC did not contract or catch this disease because they had smallpox, cowpox or chicken pox when they were infants. This led to them being immune to the disease when it spread in Western Canada  Employees that were Hudson Bay Company and Canadians (despite sexual activity between Indigenous women and employees being banned) were sensitive to the disease, however some individuals did not contract the disease. Unfortunately, there is no concrete evidence to show that the Aboriginal people blamed the British or French traders for this incident.

Edmonton House 

Edmonton House, built in October 1795. Tomison was the founder of Edmonton House and the Officer, Chief from 1795-98. After him succeeded James Curtis. Buckingham House, Cumberland House and Hudson House were properties that were a part of the Hudson Bay Company.

Food shortages 

In 1880 there were severe food shortages and some of the workers decided to stay with Indigenous peoples so that they could survive through the winter. Changes in climate essentially led to starvation due to food shortages in the area. The primary cause of large loss of life due to smallpox was not solely due to the shortage of food, however, the lack did not help strengthen the individuals in any way. It hindered them and correlated with the lack of wild animals to kill, which connected with the change in climate.

Journal 

The journals Tomison wrote not only shed light from a personal perspective onto the events that had occurred. But there was a constant entries into the journal with his private thoughts regarding the epidemic and how it had affected the land, the people and the business. This journal gives great insight into one's life during the spread of smallpox in the 1780. This enables Historians and other fields such as sociologists, biologists in their quest to understand when a particular epidemic occurred, where it spanned geographically. The personal account also shows the impact it had on people that knew those that died and the effect it had on their lives, or the extent it affected both communities. There were many observations and accounts that were made by Tomison, daily reflections that covered the fluctuations in daily life and the way the smallpox affected those in his surrounding area. In his entries it gav insight into what was going on during that time but it also brought forth parts of his character and his perspective on particular matters. In one journal entry on  December 25, 1781 it states "in the Evening Traded with the Indians & made them presents as usual, but never expect to see them again." The personal accounts from William Tomison expose the true feelings of one working first hand in the fur trade and having to negotiate, experiencing the epidemics and starvation that spanned across Western Canada.

References 

1739 births
Year of death unknown
Hudson's Bay Company people